The Chaldean Oracles are a set of spiritual and philosophical texts widely used by Neoplatonist philosophers from the 3rd to the 6th century CE. While the original texts have been lost, they have survived in the form of fragments consisting mainly of quotes and commentary by Neoplatonist writers. They were likely to have originally formed a single mystery-poem, which may have been in part compiled, in part received via trance, by Julian the Chaldean, or more likely, his son, Julian the Theurgist in the 2nd century CE. Later Neoplatonists, such as Iamblichus and Proclus, rated them highly. The 4th-century emperor Julian (not to be confused with Julian the Chaldean or Julian the Theurgist) suggests in his Hymn to the Magna Mater that he was an initiate of the God of the Seven Rays, and was an adept of its teachings. When Christian Church Fathers or other Late Antiquity writers credit "the Chaldeans", they are probably referring to this tradition.

An analysis of the Chaldean Oracles demonstrates an inspiration for contemporary gnostic teachings: fiery emanations initiate from the transcendental First Paternal Intellect, from whom the Second Intellect, the Demiurge comprehends the cosmos as well as himself. Within the First Intellect, a female Power, designated Hecate, is, like Sophia, the mediating World-Soul. At the base of all exists created Matter, made by the Demiurgic Intellect. The matter farthest from the Highest God (First Father / Intellect) was considered a dense shell from which the enlightened soul must emerge, shedding its bodily garments. A combination of ascetic conduct and correct ritual are recommended to free the soul from the confines of matter and limitations, and to defend it against the demonic powers lurking in some of the realms between Gods and mortals.

Origin
The exact origins of the Chaldean Oracles are unknown, but are usually attributed to Julian the Theurgist and/or his father, Julian the Chaldean. "Chaldea" is the term that Greeks of the 4th century BCE and later used for Babylon. It is the way they transliterated the Assyrian name Kaldū, which was an area that lay southeast of Babylonia towards the coast of the Persian Gulf. It is not known whether Julian the Chaldean was actually of Eastern descent, or whether the term "Chaldean" had by his time come to mean "magician" or practitioner of mysterious arts.

His son, Julian the Theurgist, served in the Roman army during Marcus Aurelius' campaign against the Quadi.  Julian claimed to have saved the Roman camp from a severe drought by causing a rainstorm. At least four other religious groups also claimed credit for this rainstorm. The circumstances surrounding the writing of the Oracles are also mysterious, the most likely explanation being that Julian uttered them after inducing a sort of trance, leading to the belief that they were handed down to Julian by the gods. No original documents containing the Oracles have survived to the present day, and what we know of the text has been reconstructed from fragments and quotes by later neoplatonist philosophers, as well as Christian philosophers who were influenced by Platonist thought. Neoplatonists including Porphyry, Iamblichus, and Proclus wrote extensive commentaries on the Oracles which are now lost. The most extensive surviving commentary was written by the Christian philosopher Michael Psellus in the eleventh century; Psellus' work has been an important tool for interpreting earlier and more fragmentary excerpts from the Oracles.

Whether or not they were composed by Julian himself, or whether Julian compiled them from actual Chaldean originals, the oracles are mainly a product of Hellenistic (and more precisely Alexandrian) syncretism as practiced in the cultural melting-pot that was Alexandria, and were credited with embodying many of the principal features of a "Chaldean philosophy". They were held in the greatest esteem throughout Late Antiquity, and by the later followers of neoplatonism, although frequently argued against by Augustine of Hippo.  The doctrines contained therein have been attributed by some to Zoroaster.

Importance of the Oracles
The Chaldean Oracles were considered to be a central text by many of the later neoplatonist philosophers, nearly equal in importance to Plato's Timaeus. This has led some scholars, beginning with F. Cumont, to declare the Oracles "The Bible of the Neoplatonists".

The essence of Hellenistic civilization was the fusion of a Hellenic core of religious belief and social organization with Persian-Babylonian ("Chaldean"), Israelite and Egyptian cultures, including their mysterious and enthusiastic cults and wisdom-traditions. Hellenistic thinkers philosophized the mythology and cults, as well as foreign oracular utterances and initiatory lore. Philosophy originating from these two areas, or simply attributed to them, was regarded as possessing knowledge transmitted from the most ancient wisdom traditions.

In Egypt, the attempt to philosophize and synthesize ancient religious content resulted in part in the writings conventionally attributed to Hermes Trismegistus. The Chaldean Oracles are a parallel endeavour, on a smaller scale, to philosophize the wisdom of Chaldea. However, rather than the prose writings that came out of Egypt, the Chaldean Oracles originated from the fragments of a single mystery-poem, which has not been entirely preserved. By far the greatest number of the poem's known fragments are found in the books of the later Platonic philosophers, who from the time of Porphyry, and probably that of Plotinus, held these Oracles in the highest estimation. Iamblichus of Syria referred frequently to the Oracles and mingled their ideas with his own.

Metaphysics of the Oracles
The metaphysical schema of the Chaldean Oracles begins with an absolutely transcendent deity called Father, with whom resides Power, a productive principle from which it appears Intellect proceeds. This Intellect has a twofold function, to contemplate the Forms of the purely intellectual realm of the Father, and to craft and govern the material realm. In this latter capacity the Intellect is Demiurge.

The Oracles further posit a barrier between the intellectual and the material realm, personified as Hecate. In the capacity of barrier, or more properly "membrane", Hecate separates the two 'fires,' i.e., the purely intellectual fire of the Father, and the material fire from which the cosmos is created, and mediates all divine influence upon the lower realm.

From Hecate is derived the World-Soul, which in turn emanates Nature, the governor of the sub-lunar realm. From Nature is derived Fate, which is capable of enslaving the lower part of the human soul. The goal of existence then is to purify the lower soul of all contact with Nature and Fate by living a life of austerity and contemplation. Salvation is achieved by an ascent through the planetary spheres, during which the soul casts off the various aspects of its lower soul, and becomes pure intellect.

Beneath the world of the Intelligible Triad of Father, the Magna Mater or Hecate, and Intellect lie the three successive descending Empyrean, Ethereal and Elemental Worlds. A Second Demiurgic Intellect represents the divine power in the Empyrean World, a Third Intellect represents the divine power in the Ethereal World. An Elemental World is ruled by Hypezokos or Flower of Fire.

The Chaldean Oracles were first translated into English by Thomas Stanley in 1662, and popularized by Thomas Taylor in 1797, followed by Isaac Preston Cory in 1832. They were taken up in the 19th-century esoteric order, the Hermetic Order of the Golden Dawn and Taylor's translation was published in an edition by William Wynn Westcott in 1895, titled 'The Chaldaean Oracles of Zoroaster' as part of the Golden Dawn's 'Collectanea Hermetica' series.

State of the text

The original poem has not come down to us in any connected form, and is known through quotations in the works of the neoplatonists, especially Damascius.

Wilhelm Kroll published an edition, De oraculis Chadaicis in 1894 arranging all known fragments in order of subject with a Latin translation, and this is the basis of most later scholarly work, including the study by Hans Lewy (1956), a Greek-French edition of the Oracles by Edouard des Places in 1971 and the currently standard (though not critical) edition in Greek and English by Ruth Majercik in 1989. None of these purport to be a reconstruction of the original poem but rather of the surviving fragments.

Summaries of the poem (and of the related "Assyrian Oracles", not known from elsewhere) were composed by Michael Psellos, and attempts have been made to arrange the surviving fragments in accordance with these summaries: Westcott's translation (above) is an example of such an attempt.  These reconstructions are not generally regarded as having scholarly value, but sometimes surface in theosophical or occult use.

See also
Nabataeans of Iraq, a term used by Arabic authors as a synonym of 'Chaldean' in (pseudo-)historical and philosophical contexts
The Nabataean Agriculture, a 10th-century Arabic work similarly attributed to the ancient Mesopotamians or 'Nabataeans'

Notes

References
Des Places, Édouard, Oracles chaldaïques, 3rd edn. Revised and corrected by A. Segonds, Paris 1996 (Greek text, facing French translation; introduction and notes; also contains editions of works by Psellos on the Chaldaean oracles).
Dillon, J.M. The Middle Platonists. Ithaca: Cornell University Press 1977.
Fernández Fernández, Álvaro, La teúrgia de los Oráculos Caldeos: cuestiones de léxico y de contexto histórico. Doctoral thesis, directed by José Luis Calvo Martínez. Granada: Universidad de Granada, 2011.
Johnston, Sarah Iles. Hekate Soteira: A Study of Hekate's Roles in the Chaldean Oracles and Related Literature. Oxford: Oxford University Press, 1990.
Lewy, Hans. Chaldean Oracles and Theurgy: Mystic Magic and Platonism in the Later Roman Empire, 3rd edn. Revised by Michel Tardieu. Paris: Institut des Études Augustiniennes, 2011 (2nd edn. 1978; 1st edn. 1956).
 Seng, H., Un livre sacré de l'Antiquité tardive: les Oracles chaldaïques. Bibliothèque de l'École des Hautes Études, Sciences Religieuses 170. Turnhout: Brepols, 2016,

External links
De Oraculis Chaldaicis, edited by Wilhelm Kroll, with a Latin translation
Collection of the Chaldean Oracles, collected and translated by Thomas Taylor (neoplatonist)
Echoes from the Gnosis: The Chaldæan Oracles, by G.R.S. Mead
The Chaldæan Oracles of Zoroaster, edited and revised by Sapere Aude. William Wynn Westcott, with an introduction by L. O. Percy Bullock, (1895)
 Fernández Fernández, Álvaro (2013), «En búsqueda del paraíso caldaico», ’Ilu: revista de ciencias de las religiones, 18: p. 57–94.
 Fernández Fernández, Álvaro (2015), «La ἴυγξ mediadora: ornitología, magia amorosa, mitología y teología caldaico-neoplatónica», Cuadernos de Filología Clásica. Estudios griegos e indoeuropeos, 25: p. 223-271.

3rd-century books
Ancient Greek poems
Classical oracles
Greek literature (post-classical)
Hellenistic philosophy and religion
Hermeticism
Neoplatonic texts
Occult books
Chaldea
Hecate